The Carolina Hurricanes are a professional ice hockey team based in Raleigh, North Carolina. The team is a member of the  Metropolitan Division in the Eastern Conference of the NHL. This list documents the records and playoff results for all 22 seasons the Carolina Hurricanes have completed in the NHL since their relocation from Hartford, Connecticut in 1997. The Hurricanes franchise was founded in 1971 as the New England Whalers, and played seven seasons in the World Hockey Association. The team moved to the National Hockey League in 1979, and changed names to the Hartford Whalers. The franchise played a total of 18 seasons before moving to North Carolina and changing their names to the Carolina Hurricanes. The Hurricanes are the only major pro sports team located in Raleigh. They are also the only North Carolina-based major professional sports team to ever win a championship.

Carolina played its first season in the Northeast Division before moving to the Southeast Division when the NHL realigned in 1998. The Hurricanes won one Stanley Cup, in 2005–06, and two Prince of Wales Trophy as Eastern Conference champions: 2001–02 and 2005–06. Carolina has finished atop its division five times in its history. The Hurricanes have played in over 1,800 games and qualified for the Stanley Cup playoffs nine times. The 2021–22 season represents the 25th in North Carolina.

Season-by-season

Notes

See also
 List of Hartford Whalers seasons

References

 
 
 

seasons
 
Carolina Hurricanes